Leningradskiy Island is an ice-covered island situated at the head of Leningradskiy Bay at the western margin of the Lazarev Ice Shelf, Queen Maud Land, Antarctica. It was discovered and mapped by the Soviet Antarctic Expedition in 1961, and named in association with Leningradskiy Bay.

See also
Cape Murmanskiy

References

Islands of Queen Maud Land